West Aurora Public School District 129 is a unit school district in southeastern Kane County, Illinois.  The present "West Side" school district covers the city of Aurora, Illinois with an eastern boundary of the Fox River, a southern boundary of the Kane County and Kendall County line, a western boundary of Aurora's city limits, and a northern boundary of the village limits of North Aurora, Illinois.  Students from Aurora, North Aurora, Montgomery, Illinois and Sugar Grove, Illinois attend West Aurora schools.

District 129 has a tradition in Aurora going back to the 1860s. The West Side High School and East Side High School have played an annual football game against each other since 1893. Four of the current elementary buildings are reported to be four of the oldest still in use in Aurora and in Kane County. Mary Todd school was constructed as Oak Street school, on the ruins of a prior building, and was built by the Works Progress Administration (WPA) in the 1930s. Its interior still features WPA murals and sculpture. Joseph Freeman Elementary School was dedicated in 1928. Abraham Lincoln Elementary (decommissioned in 2009), was originally the Lake Street School, and Nancy Hill Elementary, originally the Illinois Avenue School, are over a century old.

Two other school buildings exist on the historic sites of original school buildings. The Montgomery Elementary School was built in 1891. The present Nicholson Elementary, itself built in the 1950s and 1960s, replaced the Montgomery Elementary building on the same site. The original Galena Street School was built in 1895. It was renamed Greenman Elementary in 1915, and was replaced by a new building, constructed on an adjacent lot, in 2004.

West Side District 129 absorbed the former North Aurora School District #51 in the early 1960s, constructing Schneider Elementary in that village's east side in 1963, and Goodwin Elementary (as a replacement for the former North Aurora School, which stood at the corner of State Street and Lincolnway in North Aurora until it was demolished in 2015), in 1968.

The West Side District is the only one of the three major districts serving Aurora to own and operate its own fleet of School Buses: Indian Prairie School District has a contract agreement with Laidlaw and East Side District 131 does not operate any school buses).

Elementary schools

Middle schools

High school

Special Education

References

Historical Background on Names of District 129 Schools
School District 129

External links
 West Aurora School District 129 — official site

Education in Aurora, Illinois
School districts in Kane County, Illinois
1860s establishments in Illinois